Neripteron mauriciae is a species of sea snail, a marine gastropod mollusk in the family Neritidae.

Description

Distribution
This species occurs on the Comoro Islands.

References

Neritidae
Gastropods described in 1831
Taxa named by René Lesson